"Jackson, Mississippi" is a song from Kid Rock's 2003 self-titled album.  The song is about a man dealing with addiction and the effects it is having on a relationship. The song was a demo in 1995 for his album Early Morning Stoned Pimp. It was released as a dual single in January 2004 along with "Cold and Empty." It peaked at #14 on the Mainstream Rock tracks.  His original drummer for Twisted Brown Trucker and Eminem producer Bob Eubling plays drums on the song. A live version was released on the Best Buy exclusive version of 2007's Rock N Roll Jesus.  His 2008 National Guard song "Warrior" is a rewrite of Jackson, Mississippi. It uses the same musical structure of the song.. He made a music video for "Warrior", featuring NASCAR racer Dale Earnhardt Jr. and was shown at movie theatres throughout the summer of 2008.

Track listing
 "Jackson, Mississippi" (Radio Edit)
 "Jackson, Mississippi" (Album Version)

Charts

2003 songs
2004 singles
Atlantic Records singles
Kid Rock songs
Songs written by Kid Rock